Luz Daniela Gaxiola González (born 25 November 1992) is a track cyclist from  Mexico. She represented her nation at the 2011, 2013, 2014 and 2015 UCI Track Cycling World Championships.

Career results

2013
Copa Internacional de Pista
1st Keirin
2nd Team Sprint (with Frany Maria Fong Echevarria)
3rd Sprint 
3rd 500m Time Trial
Copa Cuba de Pista
2nd Sprint
2nd Team Sprint (with Frany Maria Fong Echevarria)
2nd 500m Time Trial
3rd Keirin
2014
Grand Prix of Colorado Spring
1st Team Sprint (with Frany Maria Fong Echevarria)
2nd Keirin
2nd Sprint
Copa Guatemala de Ciclismo de Pista
1st Keirin
1st Sprint
1st Team Sprint (with Frany Maria Fong Echevarria)
1st 500m Time Trial
2nd Scratch Race
Copa Internacional de Pista
1st 500m Time Trial
1st Team Sprint (with Frany Maria Fong Echevarria)
2nd Keirin
2nd Sprint
Prova Internacional de Anadia 
1st Keirin
1st Sprint
Central American and Caribbean Games
2nd  Team Sprint (with Frany Maria Fong Echevarria)
2nd  500m Time Trial
3rd  Keirin
3rd  Sprint
2015
Copa Cuba de Pista
3rd Sprint
3rd Team Sprint (with Frany Maria Fong Echevarria)
2016
Pan American Track Championships
1st  Keirin
3rd  Sprint
Copa Guatemala de Ciclismo de Pista
1st Keirin
1st Sprint
1st 500m Time Trial
2nd Omnium
3rd Points Race
2017
3rd Keirin, Keirin Cup / Madison Cup

References

External links
 
 
 
 

1992 births
Living people
Mexican female cyclists
Sportspeople from Culiacán
Cyclists at the 2011 Pan American Games
Cyclists at the 2015 Pan American Games
Cyclists at the 2019 Pan American Games
Pan American Games medalists in cycling
Pan American Games gold medalists for Mexico
Pan American Games silver medalists for Mexico
Pan American Games bronze medalists for Mexico
Medalists at the 2011 Pan American Games
Medalists at the 2019 Pan American Games
Olympic cyclists of Mexico
Cyclists at the 2020 Summer Olympics
20th-century Mexican women
21st-century Mexican women
Competitors at the 2010 Central American and Caribbean Games
Competitors at the 2014 Central American and Caribbean Games
Competitors at the 2018 Central American and Caribbean Games